Neochodaeus repandus is a species of sand-loving scarab beetle in the family Ochodaeidae. It is found in North America.

References

Further reading

 
 
 
 
 
 

scarabaeiformia
Beetles described in 1909